Chun Ho-jin (born September 9, 1960) is a South Korean actor.

Early life
Chun studied chemistry at Inha University but dropped out to pursue acting. His father Chun Gyu-deok was among the first generation of professional wrestlers in the country.

Career
Chun's acting career began in 1983 when he auditioned at Munhwa Broadcasting Corporation (MBC) and was selected. His first roles were mostly in miniseries and one-off telemovies (similar to KBS's Drama City). He came to prominence with viewers in the long-running KBS drama Love on a Jujube Tree (ko), which garnered him the Baeksang Arts Awards for Best New Actor in the television category in 1992. In later years, he earned the sobriquet "the national father" (국민 아버지) after portraying the father of the main characters in the family dramas My Golden Life (2017) and Once Again (2020), both of which had viewership ratings of over 30%. His portrayal of a bankrupt and down-on-his-luck man who has a complex relationship with his wife and their four adult children in My Golden Life won critical acclaim from both critics and viewers and earned him the Daesang (Grand Prize) at the 2017 KBS Drama Awards and a string of award nominations.

Filmography

Film

Television series

Musical theatre

Book

Awards and nominations

State honors

Notes

References

External links

Male actors from Busan
South Korean male film actors
South Korean male television actors
South Korean male musical theatre actors
1960 births
Living people
People from Busan
Yeongyang Cheon clan
20th-century South Korean male actors
21st-century South Korean male actors
Best New Actor Paeksang Arts Award (television) winners